The Carlos Palanca Memorial Awards for Literature winners in the year 1974 (rank, title of winning entry, name of author).


English division

Short story
First prize: “The Cries of Children on an April Afternoon in the Year 1957” by Gregorio Brillantes
Second prize: “The White Dress” by Estrella D. Alfon
Third prize: “Tell Me Who Cleft the Devil's Foot” by Luning B. Ira
Honorable mention “Scoring” by Joy T. Dayrit

Poetry
First prize: “Identities” by Artemio Tadena; and “Montage” by Ophelia Dimalanta
Second prize: “Boxes” by Ricardo De Ungria; and “Glass of Liquid Truths” by Gilbert Luis Centina III
Third prize: “A Liege of Datus and Other Poems” by Jose Carreon; and “Rituals and Metaphor” by Celestino M. Vega

One-act play
First prize: No winner
Second prize: “Aftercafe” by Juan H. Alegre
Third prize: “Dulce Estranjera” by Wilfrido D. Nolledo

Filipino division

Short story
First prize: No winner
Second prize: “Isang Dakot na Pira-pirasong Buhay” by Rosauro Dela Cruz
Third prize: “Malikmata” by Benigno R. Juan
Special Award: “Ang Landas Patungo sa Kalimugtong” by Reynaldo A. Duque
Honorable mention “Ang Buhay sa Ating Panahon” by Efren Reyes Abueg; and “Ulupong” by Victor Fernandez

Poetry
First prize: "si elsa sa basang sapa" by Charles Bryan Acosta
Second prize: “Litanya kay Sta. Clara at Iba pang Tula” by Teo T. Antonio
Third prize: “Ang Metapisika ng Tao” by Eduardo Garrovillas
Special Award:
“At Bumagtas ang Dilim” by Cresenciano C. Marquez Jr.
“Iluminasyon at iba pang Tula” by Ruben Vega
“Quo Vadis, Kapitan at Iba pang Tula” by Celso Daluz
“Tinig Sa Bagong Panahon” by Pedro S. Dandan
“Tipanan sa Puso ng Kasaysayan” by Bienvenido Ramos

One-act play
First prize: No winner
Second prize: 'No winner
Third prize: “P. Paulino Frito, S.J.” by Tony Perez
Honorable mention “Ama” by Frank G. Rivera; “Basurahan” by Nonilon Queano; and “Daigdig ng mga Pangarap” by Nervido Rivera

See also
 Filipino literature
 Philippine literature in English

References
 

Palanca Awards
1974 literary awards